The 2009–10 season was Swansea City's 81st season in the Football League. It was their second consecutive season in the second tier following an eighth-placed finish in the previous campaign.

Swansea finished the season in seventh place, one place higher than the previous season, having just missed out on a play-off place to Blackpool.

Events
This is a list of the significant events to occur at the club during the 2009–10 season, presented in chronological order.

May
8 May: Roberto Martínez, assistant manager Graeme Jones and chief scout Kevin Reeves started their scouting trip visiting Scotland, the Netherlands and Spain.
22 May: Swansea youngster Joe Allen was called up to the Welsh national squad to play a friendly against Estonia at Parc y Scarlets on 29 May.
22 May: Swansea City announce the signing of Queen of the South striker Stephen Dobbie. Dobbie put pen to paper on a free transfer that will keep him at the Liberty Stadium on a long-term performance-related deal.
31 May: The details of the pre-season Spanish tour are announced. Swansea will play Espanyol, Girona, and a triangular tournament against Gimnàstic de Tarragona and Sabadell.

June
2 June: Swansea City completed the signing of Southampton winger Nathan Dyer for a fee of £400,000.
4 June: Swansea City have given boss Roberto Martínez permission to hold talks with Wigan Athletic following the departure of Steve Bruce to Sunderland. Should the deal go ahead, Wigan will pay a sum close to £2 million in compensation.
11 June: Roberto Martínez was set to be unveiled as the new manager of Wigan Athletic at a press conference, but the deal was halted as Martínez failed to mention that he wanted his backroom staff from Swansea too join him. Huw Jenkins had demanded compensation for the backroom staff, and branded Whelan as "unfair and disrespectful."
15 June: Swansea and Wigan agree compensation for the loss of Martínez; the club has now confirmed the compensation package with the Premier League outfit for assistant-manager Graeme Jones, chief scout Kevin Reeves, goalkeeping coach Iñaki Bergara and masseur Oscar Brau.
16 June: Defender Matthew Collins signed a new contract extending his stay at Swansea until 2011.
16 June: Swansea City were handed a home tie against Brighton & Hove Albion in the Football League Cup first round.
16 June: Norwich City signed midfielder Owain Tudur Jones on a three-year deal for a sum thought to be in the region of £250,000.
17 June: The fixture list for all championship teams were released on 17 June. Swansea City's first match will be away against newly crowned League One champions Leicester City at the Walkers Stadium. Swansea's first home game will be against relegated Premier League side Middlesbrough.
18 June: Swansea City announced that they had offered the vacant managerial position to the Portuguese two-time Champions League-winning player Paulo Sousa and had verbally agreed a three-year contract. Swansea chairman Huw Jenkins went on to say, "He's young, bright, enthusiastic and a visionary with extensive knowledge and contacts not only throughout Europe, but world football."
23 June: Eredivisie runners-up Twente will be the first team to face Swansea City in pre-season on 18 July, they will then be playing Spanish side Almería on 1 August at the Liberty Stadium.
23 June: Paulo Sousa returned from Portugal and was officially unveiled as the new Swansea City manager at a press conference held at the Liberty Stadium at 13:30 GMT. He signed a three-year deal. Sousa said, "Together with the fans we can build a strong club, a strong city to be on the map not only in Wales and England, but everywhere."
25 June: Swansea City unveiled the online casino, 32Red, as their shirt sponsors for the 2009–10 season. The home and away kits were modeled by defenders Alan Tate and Marcos Painter.
26 June: Midfielder Joe Allen signed a new three-year contract with Swansea that will see him stay until 2012.
26 June: Swansea City rejected a £2.5 million bid from Bolton Wanderers for midfielder Ferrie Bodde.

July
2 July: Swansea and Neath Athletic agree to face each other in a pre-season friendly match on 20 July at The Gnoll.
9 July: Swansea agreed a fee believed to be £2 million with Wigan Athletic for Jason Scotland after Swansea had initially rejected a £1.25 million bid from Burnley.
13 July: Andrea Orlandi extended his stay at Swansea by signing a new one-year deal with the club.
17 July: Almería were confirmed to meet Swansea City in a pre-season friendly at the Liberty Stadium on 1 August.
18 July: The 2009–10 squad numbers were released. Notable changes were Nathan Dyer being switched from 31 to 12, new striker Stephen Dobbie was given number 14, and Mark Gower loses the "cursed" 11 jersey to number 27.
18 July: Jason Scotland completed his move to Wigan for £2 million and signed a two-year deal after receiving the necessary international clearance.
20 July: UEFA Cup winner Jordi Lopez signed a two-year deal for Swansea City on a free transfer.
25 July: Ipswich Town striker Pablo Couñago turned down the chance to join the Swans, despite both clubs agreeing an undisclosed transfer fee.
29 July: Joe Allen, Shaun MacDonald, Casey Thomas and Jazz Richards were named in Brian Flynn's Wales national under-21 football team to face Hungary in an Under-21 Euro 2011 qualifying match.

August
7 August: Ashley Williams was called up to the Welsh national team to face Montenegro in a Friendly.
8 August: Swansea football league campaign kicked off against Leicester City at the Walkers Stadium, but ended in a 2–1 defeat. However, midfielder Joe Allen suffered a Hamstring injury after 25 minutes.
11 August: Ashley Williams was named in the Championship Team of the Week following his performance against Leicester.
12 August: Swansea were drawn against Scunthorpe United at home in the second round of the League Cup following their 3–0 victory over Brighton & Hove Albion.
13 August: Swansea City and the Swansea City Council had come to an agreement to develop a Football academy in Landore in an investment worth over £1m.
18 August: Swansea City rejected a bid for Ferrie Bodde from previous, and now manager of Wigan Athletic, Roberto Martínez. It was understood that the Wigan had offered £4.5 million. However, Swansea Chairman Huw Jenkins went on to say, "Not only have we rejected the bid, but it's an offer we wouldn't even think twice about considering... In fact, the way it is structured – over such a long period of time and appearance related – it doesn't even constitute an offer."
22 August: Austrian front-man Besian Idrizaj signed for Swansea City on a two-year deal.
25 August: Swansea City's clash with Scunthorpe ended in controversy as Swansea had captain Garry Monk, Gorka Pintado and Àngel Rangel sent off, whilst striker Stephen Dobbie went off injured. This left Swansea down to just 7 men on the field. Tempers then erupted as debutant Besian Idrizaj was forced to play on despite being injured. The match would have been abandoned according to Football League rules. Football League rules state each side must have at least seven players on the pitch for a game to be played.
27 August: Swansea City completed a double swoop and signed club legend Lee Trundle on loan from Bristol City until 1 January 2010 and Craig Beattie joined the Swans from West Bromwich Albion on a three-year deal for a club record deal of £800k.

September
1 September: Swansea sign Trinidad and Tobago centre back Radanfah Abu Bakr on a three-month deal.
3 September: Lil Fuccillo became Swansea's new Chief Scout, moving from Newcastle United.
10 September: Former Ajax player Cedric van der Gun signed for Swansea on a one-year deal with an option to extend his stay a further 12 months.
28 September: Ferrie Bodde was ruled out for the rest of the season after rupturing a cruciate ligament in his left knee for a second time. Bodde lasted just eight minutes in the 2–1 victory against Sheffield United.

October
5 October: Dorus de Vries was named in the Championship Team of the Week.
7 October: Ashley Williams signed a new four-year contract that will keep him at the club until 2013.
15 October: Casey Thomas and Kerry Morgan joined Conference South side Newport County.

Players

Squad stats

Disciplinary record

Awards

PFA Team of the Year
 Ashley Williams

Championship Team of the Week
The following Swansea players have been selected in the official Championship team of the week.
11 August: Ashley Williams 
24 August: Alan Tate 
31 August: Alan Tate 
5 October: Dorus de Vries 
2 November: Garry Monk 
9 November: Darren Pratley 
7 December: Lee Trundle 
21 December: Àngel Rangel, Alan Tate, Darren Pratley, Andrea Orlandi 
25 January: Dorus de Vries, Garry Monk, Gorka Pintado 
22 February: Alan Tate 
1 March: Dorus de Vries 
19 April: Albert Serran

Transfers

In

Out

Loans

In

Out

New contracts

Championship Stats

Results summary

Results by round

Championship table

Results

Pre-season Friendlies

Football League Championship

League Cup

FA Cup

References and footnotes

2009-10
2009–10 Football League Championship by team
Welsh football clubs 2009–10 season